Coracora District is one of eight districts of the Parinacochas Province in Peru.

Geography 
Other mountains are listed below:

History
For a detailed account of the history of this city (up to c. 1951) 'La Monografia de la Provincia de Parinacochas' is a very good source. The two volume book details not only historical, but cultural information.

See also 
 Parququcha
 Tipiqucha

References

External links